Roland Caranci (March 4, 1921 – February 26, 1998) was an American football tackle. He played for the New York Giants in 1944.

References

1921 births
1998 deaths
American football tackles
Colorado Buffaloes football players
New York Giants players